The 2022 League of Ireland season was Bohemian Football Club's 132nd year in their history and their 38th consecutive season in the League of Ireland Premier Division since it became the top tier of Irish football. Bohs finished the campaign in sixth position. Bohemians also participated in the FAI Cup, exiting at the quarter final stage.

Bohs parted ways with long-term manager Keith Long after an eight year spell in late August with Declan Devine taking the job full-time shortly after.

Club

Kits

Supplier: O'Neills | Sponsor: Des Kelly Interiors

Home

Bohemians unveiled their new home kit ahead of the 2022 League of Ireland season on 7 December 2021. The jersey is made by O'Neills, now in their fourth year as the official kit manufacturer for Bohemians, and Des Kelly Interiors as the main sponsor on the front. It features a retro-look design, which means a departure from the traditional red and black stripes for the first time in eight years. The new diamond design stretches across the front, the crest used dates back to 1952 while a lyric "we don’t need nobody else" from Dublin band Whipping Boy is on the back.

Away
Bohemians announced their new 2022 away jersey on 24 January 2022 in collaboration with the Bob Marley family and Bravado, Universal Music Group’s leading global merchandise division. The jersey pays tribute to Marley’s last ever outdoor concert, which took place in the club’s stadium, Dalymount Park, on 6 July 1980. Bringing together two of people’s greatest loves, music and sport, the one-off jersey pays homage to ‘An Afternoon in the Park’, the famed Marley Dalymount concert, in its design. Featuring red, yellow and green details on the front, as well as the rear neck and sleeve trims, and an embroidered hem tag of the original concert ticket on the lower front.

Ten percent of the profits from the shirt will be used by Bohemian Football Club to purchase musical instruments and football equipment to provide to people in Asylum Centres across Ireland. This will be done in conjunction with club partners Movement of Asylum Seekers in Ireland.

As in recent years the launch of the Bohemians jersey launch was covered globally by major publications, such as ESPN, Forbes and NME.

Third

Dublin Bus and Bohemian Football Club joined forces to launch a unique one-off jersey, to be worn for all FAI Cup matches. To celebrate Pride Month, 10% of all sales are to be donated to Dublin Bus’ charity partner LGBT Ireland and Bohemians’ partners at ShoutOut. The kit, taking inspiration from Dublin Bus’ iconic seat fabric design, was launched at the Phoenix Park, a stone’s throw from where the club was founded in 1890.

Management team

Former

Squad

Players in italics left club during season

Transfers

Transfers in

Transfers out

Friendlies

Pre-season

Mid-season

Competitions

Overview

{|class="wikitable" style="text-align:left"
|-
!rowspan=2 style="width:140px;"|Competition
!colspan=8|Record
|-
!style="width:40px;"|
!style="width:40px;"|
!style="width:40px;"|
!style="width:40px;"|
!style="width:40px;"|
!style="width:40px;"|
!style="width:40px;"|
!style="width:70px;"|
|-
|Premier Division

|-
|FAI Cup

|-
!Total

League of Ireland

League table

Results summary

Results by matchday

Matches

FAI Cup

Statistics

Appearances and goals

Players in Italics left during the season

Top Scorers

Players in Italics left during season

Clean Sheets

Discipline

Players in Italics left during the season

Captains 
{| class="wikitable" style="text-align:center;width:75%;"
|-
! style=background:#990000;color:#000000| No.
! style=background:#990000;color:#000000| Pos.
! style=background:#990000;color:#000000| Player
! style=background:#990000;color:#000000| No. Games
! style=background:#990000;color:#000000| Notes
|-
| 14
| MF
|  Conor Levingston
| 20
| Captain
|-
| 21
| MF
|  Jordan Flores
| 9
| Vice-captain
|-
| 5
| DF
|  Ciaran Kelly
| 5
| 
|-
| 3
| DF
|  Tyreke Wilson
| 5
|

International call-ups

Republic of Ireland National Team

Republic of Ireland Under 21 National Team

Republic of Ireland Under 19 National Team

Northern Ireland Under 21 National Team

Awards

References

Bohemian F.C. seasons
Bohemians